The Screen Award for Best Actress - Popular Choice has been introduced in 2009 during the Screen Awards. Unlike the Screen Award for Best Actress which is chosen by the jury, this trophy is given by the viewers to the actress whose performance is judged the most popular. Aishwarya Rai was the first winner for her performance in Jodhaa Akbar in 2009. Deepika Padukone with 6 wins (2012, 2014, 2015, 2016, 2019) has the highest number of awards.

Winners

See also
Screen Awards

Screen Awards
Film awards for lead actress